Bhattadev University is a public state university located at Pathsala, Bajali district, Assam. The university is established by Bhattadev University Act, 2017 which was passed by the Governor of Assam on 7 September 2017. It was created by upgrading Bajali College of Pathsala, Bajali district.  The UGC has recognized Bhattadev University as an institution “empowered to award degrees as specified by the UGC under section 22 of the UGC Act 1956 by conducting courses  through  its  own  departments,  its  constituent  colleges  and/or through  its  affiliated  colleges  in  regular  mode  with  the  approval  of  concerned statutory  bodies/councils”  vide  its  letter  F.No.  9-12/2019  (CPP-I/PU)  dated  25 September 2019.

On 25 June 2019 Prof. Birinchi Kumar Das, PhD(IISc) took charge as the first Vice-Chancellor of Bhattadev University.

References 

Universities in Assam
2019 establishments in Assam
Educational institutions established in 2019
State universities in India
Bajali district